

Oskar Vorbrugg (11 July 1902 – 21 May 1946) was a general in the Luftwaffe of Nazi Germany during World War II. He was a recipient of the Knight's Cross of the Iron Cross.

Awards 

 Knight's Cross of the Iron Cross on 9 June 1944 as Oberst commander of Flak-Regiment 21.

References

Citations

Bibliography

 

1902 births
1946 deaths
Military personnel from Fürth
Luftwaffe World War II generals
Recipients of the Gold German Cross
Recipients of the Knight's Cross of the Iron Cross
Prisoners who died in British military detention
German prisoners of war in World War II held by the United Kingdom
People from the Kingdom of Bavaria
Major generals of the Luftwaffe
German people who died in prison custody